Julie Molé-Léger (1767-1832), was a French stage actor, playwright and memoir writer.  She is known for her memoirs, describing her life during the French revolution.   Her memoirs describe her life in exile in the Austrian Netherlands and the Dutch republic during the Reign of Terror.

References

1767 births
1832 deaths
People of the French Revolution
18th-century French actresses
French dramatists and playwrights
18th-century French memoirists
18th-century French women writers
18th-century travel writers